Chirman, also rendered as Cherman, may refer to:

Chirman-e Olya
Chirman-e Sofla

See also
 6981 Chirman, an asteroid